Lati may refer to:
 Lati, Ramsar (لاتي - Lātī), Mazandaran Province
 Lati, South Khorasan (لتي - Latī), Mazandaran Province